Eyes That See in the Dark is the 15th studio album by Kenny Rogers, first released by RCA Nashville in August 1983.

Background
Eyes That See in the Dark marks Barry Gibb's third production project of the 1980s outside of the Bee Gees. Gibb wrote most of the songs that were more reminiscent of Rogers's days with the First Edition.

Just after Barry Gibb contributed producing Dionne Warwick's Heartbreaker album, he and Rogers met later in the year and it was then that Rogers asked about some songs, and one of those songs was the title track. The other songs in this album were written in late 1982 and recorded in early 1983. Gibb recorded demos for Rogers while working with the Bee Gees for the 1983 film Staying Alive until April 1983, as Rogers started to record this album in May the same year.

The album, Rogers's first for RCA Nashville, was issued while his previous effort on Liberty Records We've Got Tonight was still in the charts and had to compete with singles from that still being issued by his previous label.

Recording
The finished instrumental tracks were dubbed onto the demos, and some of the guitar, bass, and synthesizer on the demos are heard in the completed mix. Ron Ziegler had to dub drums exactly in time with the drum machine used on the demos. Some of the musicians had also played on all of Andy Gibb's albums, Tim Renwick, George Terry, and Ron Ziegler. Barry and Maurice Gibb with Albhy Galuten appear both from the demo tracks and new recordings. "Islands in the Stream" was not a duet and Rogers was not happy with the recording. Only after Dolly Parton was brought in and recorded the song as a duet did it take off.

The producers at the vocal dub sessions were surprised by Rogers's laid-back approach. He had kept the song demos in his possession for a period of time, but still needed to read lyric sheets while singing. He also, in Galuten's opinion, was just copying Barry's vocals instead of making the songs his own, a comment for which Galuten was banished from the rest of the vocal dub sessions. Kenny recalls it differently, that the producers urged him to sing them like Barry. At any rate, his vocals do follow Barry's closely.

The Gatlin Brothers contributed background vocals on "Buried Treasure" and "Evening Star", though Barry and Maurice Gibb's backing vocals can be heard, as the demo was mixed into the final version. While the three members of the Bee Gees: Barry, Robin & Maurice Gibb did the same on "Living with You".

Release
"Islands in the Stream" became a major hit, reaching #1 on the Billboard pop, country and adult contemporary charts. It turned out to be the #1 country chart song of 1983.

Elsewhere on the album are "Buried Treasure", a single which was a top 3 country hit; the track "This Woman", which reached the top 20 on both the Billboard pop and country charts, and the title cut, "Eyes That See in the Dark", which charted on the UK Singles Chart, spending six weeks in the top 100.

Copyright of this album later passed to Kenny Rogers's self-owned label Dreamcatcher Records, and was licensed to Castle/Sanctuary. Under that license, this album was reissued on CD in Brazil. Copyright is currently owned by Capitol Records Nashville, which released it digitally; this version omits "Islands in the Stream", the most successful single from this album, for which copyright is still owned by Sony Music, current owner of RCA Records. Universal Music Group, owner of Capitol Records, did not obtain a license from Sony Music to include this song on that release, though this track can be purchased as a single track independent of the album (it mostly appears in compilations of Dolly Parton songs from Sony Music).

Track listing
 All tracks were written by Barry, Robin & Maurice Gibb except where noted.

Notes 
The song "I Will Always Love You" featured on this album was written by Barry and Maurice Gibb, and is not the same as the more famous song of the same name, which was written by Dolly Parton. Kenny Rogers would later record a rendition of the Dolly Parton song, for his 1996 covers album Vote for Love.

The song "Buried Treasure" is not to be confused with Rogers's 1978 song "Buried Treasures", which appears on his album Love or Something Like It. "Buried Treasures" had not been released as a single.

Personnel 

 Kenny Rogers – lead vocals
 Albhy Galuten – acoustic piano, electric piano, synthesizers, arrangements, conductor
 George Bitzer – acoustic piano, electric piano, synthesizers
 John Hobbs – acoustic piano (6)
 Maurice Gibb – synthesizers, guitar, bass, backing vocals
 Barry Gibb – guitar, backing vocals, arrangements
 Tim Renwick – guitar
 George Terry – guitar
 Larry McNeely – banjo
 Mitch Holder – guitar (6)
 Fred Tackett – guitar (6)
 Ron Ziegler – drums
 Paul Leim – drums (6)
 Joe Lala – percussion
 Neal Bonsanti – saxophones (2, 4)
 Whit Sidener – saxophones (2, 4)
 Peter Graves – trombone (2, 4)
 Ken Faulk – trumpet (2, 4)
 Jimmie Haskell – string arrangements (7)
 Sid Sharp – concertmaster
 Denise Decaro – backing vocals (1, 4, 7, 9, 10)
 Myrna Mathews – backing vocals (1, 4, 7, 9, 10)
 Marti McCall – backing vocals (1, 4, 7, 9, 10)
 Larry Gatlin – backing vocals (3, 6)
 Rudy Gatlin – backing vocals (3, 6)
 Steve Gatlin – backing vocals (3, 6)
 Dolly Parton – lead and harmony vocals (4)
 Robin Gibb – backing vocals (5)

Production
 Producers – Barry Gibb, Albhy Galuten and Karl Richardson.
 Engineers – Karl Richardson and Steve Klein 
 Assistant engineers – David Egerton, Tom Fouce, Neal Kent, Al Schmitt and Samii Taylor.
 Technical supervision – Dale Peterson and Larry Janus
 Mastered by Mike Fuller at Criteria Studios (Miami, Florida)
 Art direction – John Coulter
 Photography – Greg Gorman, David Jacobson and Steve Schapiro
 Project coordinators – Marge Meoli, Nancy Barney, Randy Kessler, Peggy Needleman, Dick Ashby, Eddie Choran, Scott Sands, Tom Kennedy, Michael Branch and Sandie Campbell
 Management – Ken Kragen
 Transport – Bonnie Tobias and Pete Wagner
 Make-up – Robert Norin

Charts

Weekly charts

Year-end charts

Certifications

The Eyes That See in the Dark Demos

Barry Gibb originally recorded the songs for Kenny Rogers on his album, the songs recorded from August 1982 to January–April 1983. Gibb's version of the songs was released officially in October 2006 on iTunes.

References

Kenny Rogers albums
1983 albums
RCA Records albums
Albums produced by Barry Gibb
Albums arranged by Barry Gibb
Canadian Country Music Association Top Selling Album albums